'''Fauzia Viqar is the Federal Ombudsperson for Protection Against Harassment at Workplace, Government of Pakistan. She brings decades of activism and experience in women's rights and human rights in Pakistan and globally to this position. Formerly she headed the Rah-Center for Management and Development. As the Chairperson of the Punjab Commission on the Status of Women in the government of Punjab, Pakistan, she focused on policy/legislative review and reform. There, she succeeded in placing gender equality and female empowerment at the core of government processes, by providing concrete evidence derived from unique data collection based on administrative and specialized surveys. She has worked with civil society organizations in Pakistan and with the government in Canada to promote gender equality. She has served on various policy-making boards and committees in the government, non-government organizations, and in the private sector, including Engro Powergen Qadirpur Limited.

Education 
Viqar has a Master's degree in Political Science from the McMaster University, Canada and a Master's degree in International Relations from Quaid-i-Azam University, Pakistan.

Career 
After completing her studies, Fauzia started her career in 1987 as Assistant Director at the National Center for Rural Development, Ministry of Local Government and Rural Bodies, Pakistan, after which she taught History and International Politics for 6 years.

In 2004, she joined the Children’s Aid Society of Hamilton, a public service organization in Canada where she worked on policy and practice revision to remove discrimination against persons of diverse ethno-cultural backgrounds. She focused on development of identity data collection systems and human rights/cultural sensitivity capacity building at CAS.

In 2007, she was inducted in the Provincial Public Service of Canada in the Ministry of Community Safety and Correctional Services, Ontario as Anti-Racism Training Consultant where she helped develop an inclusive programme for staff and offenders to remove race and gender bias in the prison service. 
In 2009 she was appointed Advisor for the Ministry of Community Safety & Correctional Services, where she was responsible for supporting the Ministry’s implementation of human rights based organizational change involving 700 managers and over 10,000 staff. 
In 2010, she was appointed Director at Shirkat Gah- Women’s Resource Centre where she led advocacy in a large women’s empowerment and social justice Programme in 23 districts across Pakistan for community mobilization, capacity building and district to national level advocacy on issues of women’s empowerment and gender equality. She has contributed actively to enactment and implementation of laws on domestic violence, inheritance, Crimes in the name of Honour, Family Laws and Marriage Restraint Acts, Protection of women from Harassment Act, Acid and Burn laws and improved procedures for women’s shelters.

From 2014 to 2019, Fauzia led the Punjab Commission on the Status of women as its first Chairperson. Under her leadership, the Commission undertook landmark measures to support the government for legislative and policy change evidence based policy making by establishing a unique Gender Management Information System. This assessed the status of women on over 300 indicators from over 1000 offices at national and sub-national levels in Pakistan. She also led the research efforts for the flagship annual publications entitled “Punjab Gender Parity Analysis Reports”

During her tenure as the Chairperson, she led the Punjab Women’s Helpline to report abuse which provided service to over 50 million women of Punjab. She established a  Women’s Employment Center and a Women’s Business Incubator to promote women’s employment and entrepreneurship. She also piloted rehabilitation focused efforts in Transitional Homes for women suffering abuse; led projects for building Women’s Leadership, engaged in the capacity building of 49,000 Local Government officials on family laws, child marriage prevention, and promotion of youth leadership. She contributes actively to gender sensitization of the police and Judiciary.

Fauzia has worked on Women, Peace and Security issues to promote women’s participation in decision-making in situations of conflict and post conflict rehabilitation at UN and other forums globally. She has served as Senior Adviser on donor funded and international organizations led programs (UN Women, DFID, UNFPA, EU) for women’s empowerment.  She is currently the Senior Advisor for the UN Women Gender and Inclusion Project and the Lead Accountability Advisor for the Sub National Governance II Program in Punjab and Khyber Pakhtunkhwa. She is also an Independent Director of Engro Powergen Qadirpur Limited. Alongside this, Fauzia is working with UN Women on their Gender Responsive Budgeting Project; Punjab Skills Development Fund and; the Government of Balochistan. In these roles, Fauzia aims to improve inclusion and accountability, engender budgeting frameworks, promote economic empowerment of women and propose policy framework for women’s empowerment.

Her diverse experience at the local and international level has informed the establishment of Rah Center for Management and Development (RCMD). RCMD is a development organization that provides technical assistance to governments, multilateral organizations, NGOs, and development bodies to develop programs related to gender data systems development, legislation, policy making, monitoring and evaluation, capacity building and research and analysis processes.
Fauzia engages regularly with the UN system in many global forums for monitoring Pakistan’s commitments on women’s rights and empowerment and ensuring sustainable development of women. In 2012 Fauzia presented Pakistan’s Universal Periodic Review and in 2013 she presented Pakistan’s CEDAW Shadow Report to the UN. Moreover, she prepared the Punjab report for the Government of Pakistan, participated in the Pakistan national delegation and presented at 63rd UN CSW on best practice developed in data collection by the Punjab Commission on the Status of Women.
Fauzia has also led the design and management of a USD 4 Million, donor funded (UNFPA Pakistan) Women’s Economic Empowerment and Social Wellbeing Program for economic and social empowerment of women in Punjab. This initiative included a series of province wide and district level representative surveys and interventions to achieve the program objectives. The project served as a model for other provinces and the national level.

Fauzia serves on the Board of Directors of:

1.	Engro Powergen Qadirpur Ltd

2.	Social Policy and Development Center

3.	Pakistan Electronic and Media Regulatory Authority- Punjab COC

4.	Punjab Education Foundation

Previously, she has served on the Boards of:

1.	Punjab Women Protection Authority, Pakistan

2.	Punjab Safe Cities Authority, Pakistan

3.	Punjab Local Government Commission, Pakistan

4.	National Commission on the Status of Women, Pakistan

5.	St Joseph’s Immigrant Women Center, Hamilton, Canada

Publications 
1- Society: why aren't more women working?

2- Tech revolution: are Pakistani women being left behind?

3- Why are there so few women in the courts?

4- Unsafe at Home

5- All That's Wrong with Women's Shelters

6- Road to Equality

7- Financial Protection upon Divorce

8- Marrying Young

References 
http://www.dailybusinessnews.pk/2018/11/01/fauzia-viqar-women-empowerment/

https://tribune.com.pk/story/798977/punjabs-lioness-defends-women-across-the-country/

Year of birth missing (living people)
Living people
McMaster University alumni
Pakistani chief executives
Pakistani human rights activists
Quaid-i-Azam University alumni